Torrance Esmond, better known by his stage name Street Symphony, is an American record producer and music executive from Memphis, Tennessee.

Biography

Dividing his youth between Memphis and Nashville, Street Symphony was compelled to pursue a career in music after watching an Outkast concert. With roommates owning equipment, the Sean Combs-influenced entrepreneur began making beats by fiddling with the turntables and drum machines through the night in his Middle Tennessee State University dorm. At school, Street juggled prospects of a bountiful career in Electrical Engineering with his visions of music stardom. In the end, he switched majors, formed a notable area Hip-Hop group Player Way with best friends Mike Sean and Lonnel Matthews and went all in. Through performing at college parties, Street Symphony & Player Way garnered respect and fans on campus, as well as surrounding areas. People took notice, ranging from Street's early mentor Carlos "6 July" Broady, to NBA champion superstar Gary Payton, who signed the producer to his Rock Solid imprint in 2005. It was there that Street Symphony acquainted himself with big recording studios, honing his original sounding repertoire of beats with the likes of Yo Gotti and Starlito, who were flirting with a Cash Money Records deal. Overnight sessions, traveling, and a tireless hustle gave Street Symphony a director's chair in the action, as he refined his multi-genre, unique style of music.

Solidifying his presence in Tennessee, Street Symphony took interest in the Houston hustle. As artists like Paul Wall, Chamillionaire, and Mike Jones were reaching gold and platinum, Street remembered thinking, "Let me catch this wave." As he slept on his H-Town friend's floor, worked a day-job, and devoted off hours to his craft, he networked to shop his tracks to any artists he could reach. "In the evenings, I'd get out and hustle. I'd go to Guitar Center, in the DJ room, and play my beats so everyone could hear." Local artists took interest, as well as stars like Lil' Keke of the Screwed Up Click.

After finding success in Houston, Street Symphony followed Rap's next wave to Atlanta. It was there that he connected with Ludacris's label Disturbing tha Peace working with I-20, Dolla Boy of Playaz Circle & Luda himself. In 2009 he reconnected with friend and former college classmate, Lecrae. With a label, Reach Records behind him, Lecrae hoped to expand his audience and accessibility, attaching the touted-Christian Rap star with music that legitimized his careful message. First contributing to Lecrae's Rehab album, Street Symphony's knowledge and sound attracted his longtime friend and the Reach Records' brass to want him on board. As their flagship artist was kicking down mainstream doors, Street had a musical style and a Rolodex that functioned as a key to the industry's doors. In the subsequent two years, Street Symphony would handle artist and repertoire and executive production of Lecrae's music, especially surrounding his acclaimed Church Clothes mixtape series. In their time together, Lecrae garnered a Top 3 debut, as Street Symphony earned his first GMA Dove Award and Grammy Award, for 2012's Gravity. Continuing his success with Lecrae, Esmond returned to the 2015 GRAMMY Awards, winning as co-writer & producer for Best Christian Contemporary Music Performance/Song, "Messengers".

Following his achievements in the Christian Hip Hop subgenre with Lecrae, Street Symphony returned to the mainstream focusing on his Track Or Die production company. After affiliation from working together in The Playaz Circle days, 2 Chainz welcomed Street Symphony to the studio to assist in crafting the EP, Freebase—including video single "Trap Back." Additional frequent collaborators include: Yo Gotti, Starlito, Don Trip, Snootie Wild, and Tracy T.

Once shopping his sound from Tennessee to Texas to Georgia, top artists are now the ones traveling to Street Symphony to maestro their music.

Track Or Die
After two years of working on staff as Vice President of A&R, he departed from Reach Records and in February 2014 launched his own label, publishing and mgmt company, Track Or Die.

 Artists
 Moe The Natural

 In-House Producers
 D.O. Speaks
 8X8 Bocci
 J Super
 Kangaroo
 Moe The Natural
 Tez Mania 

Former
 Reconcile
 Tyshane aka Beam
 GNRA
 Spade Melo
 Ronnie Doe

Production credits
The following is a list of songs produced or co-produced by Street Symphony.

2022
Steven Malcolm - [Tree]
8. Red Light Green Light (featuring Jay-Way & Ty Brassel) 
15. Glory On Me (featuring Childish Major & Taylor Hill)

DaniLeigh - [My Side]
2. Heartbreaker

2021
Steven Malcolm - [All Is True]
5. Glory On Me (featuring Childish Major & Taylor Hill)

2020
Yo Gotti - Untrapped
2. More Ready Than Ever

Jada Kingdom - Non Album Single
1. Green Dreams

2019

Raja Kumari - [Bloodline]
2. Karma

Raja Kumari - [Bloodline]
5. Born Hustla (feat. Janine The Machine)

Jacob Latimore - [Connection 2]
6. Mine (feat. Q Money)

Dave East - Survival
12. Everyday (featuring Gunna)
Yo Gotti - I Told U So (with DJ Drama) 
 14. Work Hard Play Hard (featuring Block Burnaz)

2018

Dave East - Paranoia 2
15. Grateful (featuring Marsha Ambrosius)

Saint Malo - Wild Wild West
4. Who Am I featuring Lester Shaw

Saint Malo - Wild Wild West
A & R / Executive Producer

Nipsey Hussle - Victory Lap
7. Hussle & Motivate

Tiffany Foxx - Non Album Single
1. War Zone

Dave East - Karma 2
1. Imagine

2017

Starlito & Don Trip - Step Brothers 3
04. If My Girl Find Out
06. Me & You Both 
10. 25th Song
15. Untitled No Hook

DaBoyDame, Blac Youngsta & Mozzy - Can't Fake The Real
10. Get Whacked

David Banner - The God Box
02. Black Fist (featuring Tito Lopez)

Starlito - Hot Chicken
09. TBG (featuring Red Dot, West & Marty)
19. Outro

Meek Mill - Wins & Losses
13. - YBA (featuring The-Dream) 
14. - Open (featuring Verse Simmonds)

Starlito - Non Album Single
01. You Should Be Proud

GNRA - Heartlines EP
A & R / Executive Producer

Don Trip - Free Roy, Free Fletch
04. 10:04pm

Alphabet Rockers - Risen Shine #Woke

Rikki Blu - You Cant Make Me
07. Youth

Trav - QRAK (Queens Raised A King)
19. Bando (featuring Lil Durk)

2016
Wale - Non Album Single
01. PowerBall Freestyle
2 Chainz - Felt Like Cappin
05. Minding My Business
Yo Gotti - The Art of Hustle
09. Momma
Kris J - The A.R.T. Project
06. Follies
David Banner - Before The Box
02. Black Fist
Don Trip - The Head That Wears The Crown
06. Higher Learning
MMG - Priorities 4 
17. Powerball Freestyle
Trav - Push 3
02. Its A Will Its A Way
21. We Living
G-Eazy - Non Album Single
01. So Much Better
Trina - Non Album Single
01. Overnight
Zoey Dollaz - October
01. Scammers (featuring Fat Trel)
06. U Can Be That (featuring Ink)

2015
Yo Gotti - Concealed (with DJ Drama) 
 03. Super Power
Neek Bucks - Here For A Reason 2
05. How Can I  (featuring Kevin Gates)
Plane Jaymes - Vape Music Vol 1
06. Align
Starlito - Introversion
18. It's OK (featuring Robin Raynelle)
20. 10,000 Hours
Rikki Blu - Non Album Single
01. Holy Vices
Don Trip - GodSpeed
07. Get Away (featuring Singa B)
17. Losing Streak
2 Chainz - Trap-A-Velli Tre
09. Halo (Letter From My Unborn Son)
Tracy T - 50 Shades of Green
15. Hard Way (featuring MeetSims)
Reconcile - Catchin' Bodies EP
A & R / Executive Producer
Blac Youngsta - I Swear To God
10. Codeine
Yo Gotti - CM8
6. No Mo

2014
Don Trip - Randy Savage
04. Road Warriors (featuring Starlito) 
07. Cream of the Crop
08. Neil Armstrong
2 Chainz - Freebase
01. Trap Back
Tracy T - The Wolf of All Streets
14. Save Me
Lecrae - Anomaly
A&R
01. Outsiders
15. Messengers (featuring For King & Country)
Wave Chapelle - Only The Beginning
05. I Want It All
Snootie Wild - Go Mode 
01. Here I Go (featuring Starlito)
Scotty - Spaghetti Junction
10. Long Day 2ma
15. Stealing Shit
Starlito - Black Sheep Don't Grin
10. She Just Want The Money (featuring Don Trip, Petty & WILX)
12. No Rearview TWO (featuring Don Trip and Yo Gotti)

2013
Andy Mineo - Heroes for Sale
13. Curious 
15. Tug Of War (featuring Krizz Kaliko)
Scotty - F.A.I.T.H. (Forever Atlanta In The Heart)
17. Fuss And Fight (featuring Lecrae)
Derek Minor - Minorville
02. In God We Trust featuring Thi'sl)
12. Dear Mr. Christian (featuring Dee-1 and Lecrae)
Starlito & Don Trip - Step Brothers 2
01. Paper, Rock, Scissors 
Lecrae - Church Clothes 2
A & R / Executive Producer
01. Co-Sign pt. 2 
02. Believe
07. Sell Out 
15. My Whole Life Changed 
17. Hang On

2012
Json - Growing Pains
02. Making Me Over (featuring Pastor AD3 and Tedashii)
Swoope - Wake Up
04. Schizo (featuring Tedashii)
Lecrae - Church Clothes
A & R / Executive Producer
01. Co-Sign
04. Cold World (featuring Tasha Catour) 
12. No Regrets (featuring Suzy Rock) 
KB - Weight & Glory 
04. Don't Mean Much (featuring Sho Baraka and Mitch Parks from After Edmund)
Canon - Non Album Single
01. Work 
Alex Faith - Honest 2 God
04. Georgia Clay (featuring JAMM)
Lecrae - Gravity
A & R / Executive Producer
01. The Drop (Intro) 
06. Fakin (featuring Thi'sl)
10. Buttons
12. Lord Have Mercy (featuring Tedashii) 
14. Tell The World (featuring Mali Music)

2011
Lecrae - Rehab: The Overdose
01. Overdose
05. Blow Your High (featuring Canon)
Trina - Diamonds Are Forever
10. Waist So Skinny (featuring Rick Ross)
Tedashii - Blacklight
09. Go Until I'm Gone (featuring Thi'sl)
Thi'sl - Beautiful Monster
08. My Radio On Drugs
11. It's Not About Me (featuring Pettidee)

2010
I-20 - Non Album Single
01. Down Chic (featuring Devin the Dude and Lil Keke)
Arab - The Package
07. Go
09. 31st Floor
Dolla Boy of Playaz Circle - It's Official
15. Oxygen (featuring J. Hard)
Lecrae - Rehab
09. New Shalom (featuring Derek Minor)
Starlito - Starlito's Way 3: Life Insurance
03. SW3

2009
Lil Scrappy - Non Album Single
01. Look Like This (featuring Gucci Mane)
Clyde Carson - Bass Rock 
02. Popular Thugs (featuring The Jacka)
B.G. - Built To Last 1.5
14. Gotta Get My Money (Remix) (featuring Gorilla Zoe, Yung LA, Bun B, TC and Lady Dolla]
Starlito - I Love You, Too Much: The Necessary Evils
08. I Don't Believe Her 
Starlito - The Tenn-A-Keyan 3
21. Grind Hard Cypher

Awards and achievements
43rd Annual GMA Dove Awards (2012) - Awarded Rap/Hip Hop Album of the Year 
44th Annual GMA Dove Awards (2013) - Awarded Rap/Hip Hop Song of the Year 
44th Annual GMA Dove Awards (2013) - Awarded Rap/Hip Hop Album of the Year
46th Annual GMA Dove Awards (2015) - Awarded Rap/Hip Hop Album of the Year
50th Annual Grammy Awards - Nominated for Best Contemporary R&B Album 
51st Annual Grammy Awards - Nominated for Best R&B Song
51st Annual Grammy Awards - Nominated for Best Female R&B Vocal Performance
55th Annual Grammy Awards - Awarded Best Gospel Album 
57th Annual Grammy Awards - Awarded for Best Contemporary Christian Music Performance/Song 
60th Annual Grammy Awards - Nominated for Best Children's Album
61st Annual Grammy Awards - Nominated for Best Rap Album
62nd Annual Grammy Awards - Nominated for Best Children's Album

References

21st-century American businesspeople
21st-century American musicians
American music industry executives
African-American businesspeople
African-American record producers
American hip hop record producers
Musicians from Nashville, Tennessee
Songwriters from Tennessee
Middle Tennessee State University alumni
Living people
People from Memphis, Tennessee
Year of birth missing (living people)
21st-century African-American musicians